Stanislav Hristov (born 28 September 1990) is a Bulgarian footballer, who plays as a defender.

External links 
 

1990 births
Living people
Bulgarian footballers
Association football defenders
PFC Spartak Varna players
First Professional Football League (Bulgaria) players